Mandjafa is a small town  in Massenya, Chari-Baguirmi, southwestern Chad. Its post office opened in 1910.

Populated places in Chad